The Mighty Gents is a 1978 play which originally starred Morgan Freeman and Dorian Harewood in its Broadway theater debut.

Overview
The story of gang members in Newark, New Jersey.

Critical reception
The Washington Post called a 1978 staging of The Mighty Gents "An effective, generally first-class staging of Richard Wesley's drama."

References

External reviews
Inside the Actors Studio

All-Black cast Broadway shows
Broadway plays
Plays set in the 1970s
1978 plays
American plays
English-language plays
African-American plays